Patricia Midori Castañeda Miyamoto (born March 16, 1990, in Mexico City) is a Mexican swimmer of Japanese descent. She is also known as Patricia Castañeda.

At the 2007 Pan American Games, she garnered 2 silver medals by finishing second in the 400m and 800m freestyle.

She competed at the 2012 Summer Olympics in the women's 800 m freestyle, finishing in 27th place.

See also
 List of Mexican records in swimming

References

External links

1990 births
Mexican female swimmers
Swimmers from Mexico City
Mexican people of Japanese descent
Living people
Swimmers at the 2007 Pan American Games
Swimmers at the 2011 Pan American Games
Olympic swimmers of Mexico
Swimmers at the 2012 Summer Olympics
Pan American Games silver medalists for Mexico
Pan American Games bronze medalists for Mexico
Pan American Games medalists in swimming
Central American and Caribbean Games gold medalists for Mexico
Central American and Caribbean Games bronze medalists for Mexico
Competitors at the 2006 Central American and Caribbean Games
Central American and Caribbean Games medalists in swimming
Medalists at the 2007 Pan American Games
Medalists at the 2011 Pan American Games
20th-century Mexican women
21st-century Mexican women